Niveria suffusa is a species of small sea snail, a marine gastropod mollusk in the family Triviidae, the false cowries or trivias.

Distribution

Description 

Habitat 
Minimum recorded depth is 0 m.

References

External links

Triviidae
Gastropods described in 1827
Taxa named by John Edward Gray